The following is a list of  indigenous peoples of South America. These include the peoples living in South America in the pre-Columbian era and the historical and contemporary descendants of those peoples.

Circum-Caribbean
The Circum-Caribbean cultural region was characterized by anthropologist Julian Steward, who edited the Handbook of South American Indians. It spans indigenous peoples in the Caribbean, Central American, and northern South America, the latter of which is listed here.

Colombia and Venezuela

The Colombia and Venezuela culture area includes most of Colombia and Venezuela. Southern Colombia is in the Andean culture area, as are some peoples of central and northeastern Colombia, who are surrounded by peoples of the Colombia and Venezuela culture. Eastern Venezuela is in the Guianas culture area, and southeastern Colombia and southwestern Venezuela are in the Amazonia culture area.

Abibe, northwestern Colombia
Aburrá, central Colombia
Achagua (Axagua), eastern Colombia, western Venezuela
Agual, western Colombia
Amaní, central Colombia
Ancerma, western Colombia
Andaquí (Andaki), Huila Department, Colombia
Andoque, (Andoke, southeastern Colombia
Antiochia, Colombia
Arbi, western Colombia
Arma, western Colombia
Atunceta, western Colombia
Auracana, northeastern Colombia
Buriticá, western Colombia
Calamari, northwestern Colombia
Calima, western Colombia, 200 BCE–400 CE
Caramanta, western Columbia
Carate, northeastern Colombia
Carare, northeastern Colombia
Carex, northwestern Colombia
Cari, western Colombia
Carrapa, western Colombia
Cartama, western Colombia
Cauca, western Colombia, 800–1200 CE
Corbago, northeastern Colombia
Cosina, northeastern Colombia
Catio, northwestern Colombia
Cenufaná, northwestern Colombia
Chanco, western Colombia
Coanoa, northeastern Colombia
Evéjito, western Colombia
Fincenú, northwestern Colombia
Gorrón, western Colombia
Guahibo (Guajibo), eastern Colombia, southern Venezuela
Guambía, western Colombia
Guane, Colombia, pre-Columbian culture
Guanebucan, northeastern Colombia
Guayupe, central-eastern Colombia
Guazuzú, northwestern Colombia
Hiwi, western Colombia, eastern Venezuela
Itoto, Wotuja, or Jojod, Venezuela
Jamundí, western Colombia
Kogi, northern Colombia
Lile, western Colombia
Lache, central Colombia
Mompox, northwestern Colombia
Motilone, northeastern Colombia and western Venezuela
Muisca, central Colombia
Muzo, central Colombia
Naura, central Colombia
Nauracota, central Colombia
Noanamá (Waunana, Huaunana, Woun Meu), northwestern Colombia and Panama
Nutabé, northwestern Colombia
Opón, northeastern Colombia
Panche, central Colombia
Pacabueye, northwestern Colombia
Pancenú, northwestern Colombia
Patángoro, central Colombia
Paucura, western Colombia
Pemed, northwestern Colombia
Pequi people, western Colombia
Piaroa, Colombia and Venezuela
Picara, western Colombia
Pijao, central Colombia
Pozo, western Colombia
Quimbaya, central Colombia, 4th–7th CE
Quinchia, western Colombia
Sutagao, central Colombian
Tahamí, northwestern Colombia
Tairona, northern Colombia, pre-Columbian culture, 1st–11th CE
Tamalameque, northwestern Colombia
Tegua, central Colombia
Timba, western Colombia
Tinigua, Caquetá Department, Colombia
Tolú, northwestern Colombia
Toro, western Colombia
Tupe, northeastern Colombia
Turbaco people, northwestern Colombia
Urabá, northwestern Colombia
Urezo, northwestern Colombia
U'wa, eastern Colombia, western Venezuela
Wayuu (Wayu, Wayúu, Guajiro, Wahiro), northeastern Colombia and northwestern Venezuela
Xiriguana, northeastern Colombia
Yamicí, northwestern Colombia
Yapel, northwestern Colombia
Yarigui, northeastern Colombia
Yukpa, Yuko, northeastern Colombia
Zamyrua, northeastern Colombia
Zendagua, northwestern Colombia
Zenú, northwestern Colombia, pre-Columbian culture, 200 BCE–1600 CE
Zopia, western Colombia

Guianas
This region includes northern parts Colombia, French Guiana, Guyana, Suriname, Venezuela, and parts of the Amazonas, Amapá, Pará, and Roraima States in Brazil.

Acawai (6N 60W)
Acokwa (3N 53W)
Acuria (Akurio, AkuriyoRoraima, Brazil, Guyana, and Venezuela
Amariba (2N 60W)
Amicuana (2N 53W)
Apalaí (Apalai), Amapá, Brazil
Apirua (3N 53W)
Apurui (3N 53W)
Aracaret (4N 53W)
Aramagoto (2N 54W)
Aramisho (2N 54W)
Arebato (7N 65W)
Arekena (2N 67W)
Arhuaco, northeastern Colombia
Arigua
Arinagoto (4N 63W)
Arua (1N 50W)
Aruacay, Venezuela
Atorai (2N 59W)
Atroahy (1S 62W)
Auaké, Brazil and Guyana
Baniwa (Baniva) (3N 68W), Brazil, Colombia and Venezuela
Baraüana (1N  65W)
Bonari (3S 58W)
Baré (3N 67W)
Caberre (4N 71 W)
Cadupinago
Cariaya (1S 63 W)
Carib (Kalinago), Venezuela
Carinepagoto, Trinidad
Chaguan, Venezuela
Chaima, Venezuela
Cuaga, Venezuela
Cuacua, Venezuela
Cumanagoto, Venezuela
Guayano, Venezuela
Guinau (4N 65W)
Hixkaryána, Amazonas, Brazil
Inao (4N 65W)
Ingarikó, Brazil, Guyana and Venezuela
Jaoi (Yao), Guyana, Trinidad and Venezuela
Kali'na, Brazil, Guyana, French Guiana, Suriname, Venezuela
Lokono (Arawak, Locono), Guyana, Trinidad, Venezuela
Macapa (2N 59W)
Macushi, Brazil and Guyana
Maipure (4N 67W)
Maopityan (2N 59W)
Mapoyo (Mapoye), Venezuela
Marawan (3N 52W)
Mariche, Venezuela
Mariusa, Venezuela
Marourioux (3N 53W)
Nepuyo (Nepoye), Guyana, Trinidad and Venezuela
Orealla, Guyana
Palengue, Venezuela
Palikur, Brazil, French Guiana
Parauana (2N 63W)
Parauien (3S 60W)
Pareco, Venezuela
Paria, Venezuela
Patamona, Roraima, Brazil
Pauishana (2N 62W)
Pemon (Arecuna), Brazil, Guyana, and Venezuela
Piapoco (3N 70W)
Piaroa, Venezuela
Pino (3N 54W)
Piritú, Venezuela
Purui (2N 52W)
Saliba (Sáliva), Venezuela
Sanumá, Venezuela, Brazil
Shebayo, Trinidad
Sikiana (Chikena, Xikiyana), Brazil, Suriname
Tagare, Venezuela
Tamanaco, Venezuela
Tarumá (3S 60W)
Tibitibi, Venezuela
Tiriyó (Tarëno), Brazil, Suriname
Tocoyen (3N 53W)
Tumuza, Venezuela
Wai-Wai, Amazonas, Brazil and Guyana
Wapishana, Brazil and Guyana
Warao (Warrau), Guyana and Venezuela
Wayana (Oyana), Pará, Brazil
Ya̧nomamö (Yanomami), Venezuela and Amazonas, Brazil
Ye'kuana, Venezuela, Brazil

Eastern Brazil

This region includes parts of the Ceará, Goiás, Espírito Santo, Mato Grosso, Mato Grosso do Sul, Pará, and Santa Catarina states of Brazil

Apinajé (Apinaye Caroyo), Rio Araguiaia
Apurinã (Popũkare), Amazonas and Acre
Arara, Pará
Bororo (Borôro), Mato Grosso
Botocudo (Lakiãnõ)
Carijo Guarani
East Brazilian Tradition, Precolumbian culture
Guató (Guato), Mato Grosso
Kadiwéu (Guaicuru), Mato Grosso do Sul
Karajá (Iny, Javaé), Goiás, Mato Grosso, Pará, and Tocantins
Kaxixó, Minas Gerais
Kayapo (Cayapo, Mebêngôkre), Mato Grosso and Pará
Laklãnõ, Santa Catarina
Mehim (Krahô, Crahao), Rio Tocantins
Ofayé, Mato Grosso do Sul
Parakatêjê (Gavião), Pará
Pataxó, Bahia
Potiguara (Pitigoares), Ceará
Tabajara, Ceará
Tupiniquim, Espírito Santo
Umutina (Barbados)
Xakriabá (Chakriaba, Chikriaba, or Shacriaba), Minas Gerais
Xavánte (Shavante), Mato Grosso
Xerénte (Sherente), Goiás
 Xucuru, Pernambuco

Andes

Andean Hunting-Collecting Tradition, Argentina, 11,000–4,000 CE
Awa-Kwaiker, northern Ecuador, southern Colombia
Aymara, Bolivia, Chile, Peru
Cañari, Ecuador
Capulí culture, Ecuador, 800—1500 CE
Cerro Narrio (Chaullabamba) (Precolumbian culture)
Chachapoyas, Amazonas, Peru
Chachilla (Cayapas)
Chanka (Chanca), Peru
Chavín, northern Peru, 900–200 BCE
Chipcha, Colombia (Precolumbian culture)
Chincha people, Peru (Precolumbian culture)
Chuquibamba culture (Precolumbian culture)
Conchucos
Diaguita
Amaicha, Argentina
Calchaquí, Argentina
Chicoana, Salta, Argentina
Quilmes (Precolumbian culture), Argentina
Guangaia (Precolumbian culture)
Ichuña microlithic tradition (Precolumbian culture)
Inca Empire (Inka), based in Peru
Jama-Coaque (Precolumbian culture)
Jujuyes, Argentina, Bolivia, Chile
Churumatas, Argentina, Bolivia, Chile
Chirimano, Argentina
Pelicochos, Argentina
Palomos, Argentina
Killke culture, Peru, 900–1200 CE
Kogi
Kolla (Colla), Argentina, Bolivia, Chile
La Tolita (Precolumbian culture)
Las Vegas culture, coastal Ecuador, 8000 BCE–4600 BCE
Lauricocha culture, Peru, 8000–2500 BCE
Lima culture, Peru, 100–650 CE
Maina, Ecuador, Peru
Manteño-Huancavilca (Precolumbian culture)
Milagro (Precolumbian culture)
Mollo culture, Bolivia, 1000–1500 CE
Muisca, Colombian highlands (Precolumbian culture)
Pachacama (Precolumbian culture)
Paez (Nasa culture), Colombian highlands (Precolumbian culture)
Panzaleo (Precolumbian culture)
Pasto
Pijao, Colombia
Quechua (Kichua, Kichwa)
Q'ero
Chankas
Wankas (Huancas)
Quitu culture, 2000 BCE—1550 CE
Salinar (Precolumbian culture)
Saraguro
Tiwanaku culture (Tiahuanaco), 400–1000 CE, Bolivia
Tomatas, Tarija, Bolivia 
Tsáchila (Colorado), Ecuador
Tuza-Piartal (Precolumbian culture)
Uru, Bolivia, Peru
Uru-Murato, Bolivia
Wari culture, central coast and highlands of Peru, 500–1000 CE
Pocra culture, Ayacucho Province, Peru, 500–1000 CE

Pacific Lowlands

Amotape complex, northern coastal Peru, 9,000–7,1000 BCE
Atacameño (Atacama, Likan Antaí), Chile
Awá, Colombia and Ecuador
Bara, Colombia
Cara culture, coastal Ecuador, 500 BCE–1550 CE
Bahía, Ecuador, 500 BCE–500 CE
Casma culture, coastal Peru, 1000–1400 CE
Chancay, central coastal Peru, 1000–1450 CE
Chango, coastal Peru, northern Chile
Chimú, north coastal Peru, 1000–1450 CE
Cupisnique (Precolumbian culture), 1000-200 BCE, coastal Peru
Lambayeque (Sican culture), north coastal Peru, 750–1375 CE
Machalilla culture, coastal Ecuador, 1500–1100 BCE
Manteño civilization, western Ecuador, 850–1600 CE
Moche (Mochica), north coastal Peru, 1–750 CE
Nazca culture (Nasca), south coastal Peru, 1–700 CE
Norte Chico civilization (Precolumbian culture), coastal Peru
Paiján culture, northern coastal Peru, 8700–5900 BCE
Paracas, south coastal Peru, 600–175 BCE
Recuay culture, Peru (Precolumbian culture)
Tallán (Precolumbian culture), north coastal Peru
Valdivia culture, Ecuador, 3500–1800 BCE
Virú culture, Piura Region, Peru, 200 BCE–300 CE
Wari culture (Huari culture), Peru, 500–1000 CE
 Yukpa (Yuko), Colombia
 Yurutí, Colombia

Amazon

Northwestern Amazon
This region includes Amazonas in Brazil; the Amazonas and Putumayo Departments in Colombia; Cotopaxi, Los Rios, Morona-Santiago, Napo, and Pastaza Provinces and the Oriente Region  in Ecuador; and the Loreto Region in Peru.

Arabela, Loreto Region, Peru
Arapaso (Arapaco), Amazonas, Brazil
Baniwa
Barbudo, Loreto Region, Peru
Bora,  Loreto Region, Peru
Candoshi-Shapra (Chapras), Loreto Region, Peru
Carútana (Arara), Amazonas, Brazil
Chayahuita (Chaywita) Loreto Region, Peru
Cocama, Loreto Region, Peru
Cofán (Cofan), Putumayo Department, Colombia and Ecuador
Cubeo (Kobeua), Amazonas, Brazil and Colombia
Dâw, Rio Negro, Brazil
Flecheiro
Huaorani (Waorani, Waodani, Waos), Ecuador
Hupda (Hup), Brazil, Colombia
Jibito, Loreto Region, Peru
Jivaroan peoples, Ecuador and Peru
Achuar, Morona-Santiago Province and Oriente Region, Ecuador and Loreto Region, Peru
Aguaruna (Aguarana), Ecuador, Peru
Huambisa, Peru
Shuar, Morona-Santiago Province and Oriente Region, Ecuador and Loreto Region, Peru
Kachá (Shimaco, Urarina), Loreto Region, Peru
Kamsá (Sebondoy), Putumayo Department, Colombia
Kanamarí, Amazonas, Brazil
Kichua (Quichua)
Cañari Kichua (Canari)
Canelo Kichua (Canelos-Quichua), Pataza Province, Ecuador
Chimborazo Kichua
Cholos cuencanos
Napo Runa (Napo Kichua, Quijos-Quichua, Napo-Quichua), Ecuador and Peru
Saraguro
Sarayacu Kichua, Pastaza Province, Ecuador
Korubu, Amazonas, Brazil
Kugapakori-Nahua
Macaguaje (Majaguaje), Río Caquetá, Colombia
Machiguenga, Peru
Marubo
Matsés (Mayoruna, Maxuruna), Brazil and Peru
Mayoruna (Maxuruna)
Miriti, Amazonas Department, Colombia
Murato, Loreto Region, Peru
Mura, Amazonas, Brazil
Pirahã (Mura-pirarrã), Amazonas, Brazil
Nukak (Nukak-Makú), eastern Colombia
Ocaina, Loreto Region, Peru
Omagua (Cambeba, Kambeba, Umana), Amazonas, Brazil
Orejón (Orejon), Napo Province, Ecuador
Panoan, western Brazil, Bolivia, Peru
Sharpas
Siona (Sioni), Amazonas Department, Colombia
Siriano, Brazil, Colombia
Siusi, Amazonas, Brazil
Tariano (Tariana), Amazonas, Brazil
Tsohom Djapá
Tukano (Tucano), Brazil, Colombia
Barasana (Pareroa, Taiwano), Amazonas, Brazil and Vaupés, Colombia
Eastern Tukanoan (Tucanoan)
Makuna (Buhagana, Macuna), Amazonas, Brazil and Vaupés, Colombia
Waikino (Vaikino), Amazonas, Brazil
Waimiri-Atroari (Kinja, Uaimiri-Atroari), Amazonas and Roraima, Brazil
Wanano (Unana, Vanana), Amazonas, Brazil
Witoto
Murui Witoto,  Loreto Region, Peru
Yagua (Yahua), Loreta Region, Peru
Yaminahua (Yaminawá)
Yora
Záparo (Zaparo), Pastaza Province, Ecuador
Zuruahã (Suruahá, Suruwaha), Amazonas, Brazil

Eastern Amazon
This region includes Amazonas, Maranhão, and parts of Pará States in Brazil.

Amanayé (Ararandeura), Brazil
Araweté (Araueté, Bïde), Pará, Brazil
Awá (Guajá), Brazil
Ch'unchu, Peru
Ge
Guajajára (Guajajara), Maranhão, Brazil
Guaraní, Paraguay
Ka'apor, Maranhão, Brazil
Kuruaya, Pará, Brazil
Marajoara, Precolumbian culture, Pará, Brazil
Panará, Mato Grosso and Pará, Brazil
Parakanã (Paracana)
Suruí do Pará, Pará, Brazil
Tembé (Tembe)
Turiwára (Turiwara)
Wayampi
Zo'é people, Pará, Brazil

Southern Amazon
This region includes southern Brazil (Mato Grosso, Mato Grosso do Sul, parts of Pará, and Rondônia) and Eastern Bolivia (Beni Department).

Apiacá (Apiaká), Mato Grosso and Pará, Brazil
Assuriní do Toncantins (Tocantin)
Aweti (Aueto), Mato Grosso, Brazil
Bakairí (Bakairi)
Chácobo (Chacobo)
Chiquitano (Chiquito)
Cinta Larga, Mato Grosso, Brazil
Enawene Nawe, Mato Grosso, Brazil
Gavião of Rondônia
Guarayu
Ikpeng (Xicao), Mato Grosso, Brazil
Irántxe (Iranche)
Juma (Kagwahiva), Rondônia, Brazil
Jurúna (Yaruna, Juruna, Yudjá), Mato Grosso, Brazil
Kaiabi (Caiabi, Cajabi, Kajabi, Kayabi), Mato Grosso, Brazil
Kalapálo (Kalapalo), Mato Grosso, Brazil
Kamayurá (Camayura), Mato Grosso, Brazil
Kanoê (Kapixaná), Rondônia, Brazil
Karipuná (Caripuna)
Karitiâna (Caritiana), Brazil
Kayapo, Mato Grosso, Brazil
Kuikuro, Mato Grosso, Brazil
Matipu, Mato Grosso, Brazil
Mehináku (Mehinacu, Mehinako), Mato Grosso, Brazil
Moxo (Mojo), Bolivia
Nahukuá (Nahuqua), Mato Grosso, Brazil
Nambikuára (Nambicuara, Nambikwara), Mato Grosso, Brazil
Pacahuara (Pacaguara)
Pacajá (Pacaja)
Panará, Mato Grosso and Pará, Brazil
Parecís (Paressi)
Rikbaktsa (Erikbaksa), Mato Grosso, Brazil
Rio Pardo people, Mato Grosso, Brazil
Sateré-Mawé (Maue), Brazil
Suyá (Kisedje), Mato Grosso, Brazil
Tacana, La Paz Department, Bolivia
Tapajó (Tapajo)
Tapirapé (Tapirape)
Tenharim
Terena, Mato Gross and Mato Grosso do Sul, Brazil
Trumai, Mato Grosso, Brazil
Tsimané (Pano)
Uru-Eu-Wau-Wau, Rondônia, Brazil
Wari' (Pacanawa, Waricaca'), Rondônia, Brazil
Wauja (Waurá, Waura), Mato Grosso, Brazil
Wuy jugu (Mundurucu, Munduruku)
Yawalapiti (Iaualapiti), Mato Grosso, Brazil

Southwestern Amazon
This region includes the Cuzco, Huánuco Junín, Loreto, Madre de Dios, and Ucayali Regions of eastern Peru, parts of Acre, Amazonas, and Rondônia, Brazil, and parts of the La Paz and Beni Departments of Bolivia.

Aguano (Santacrucino, Uguano), Peru
Aikanã, Rondônia, Brazil
Akuntsu, Rondônia, Brazil
Amahuaca, Brazil, Peru
Asháninka (Campa, Chuncha), Acre, Brazil and Junín, Pasco, Huánuco, and Ucayali, Peru
Banawá (Jafí, Kitiya), Amazonas, Brazil
Cashibo (Carapache), Huánuco Region, Peru
Conibo (Shipibo-Conibo), Peru and Amazonas, Brazil
Ese Ejja (Chama), Beni Department, Bolivia
Harakmbut, Madre de Dios, Peru
Amarakaeri, Madre de Dios Region, Peru
Kareneri, Madre de Dios Region, Peru
Huachipaeri, Madre de Dios Region, Peru
 Arasairi, Madre de Dios Region, Peru
 Manuquiari, Madre de Dios Region, Peru
 Puikiri (Puncuri), Madre de Dios Region, Peru
 Sapiteri, Madre de Dios Region, Peru
 Toyeri, Madre de Dios Region, Peru
Hi-Merimã, Himarimã, Amazonas, Brazil
Jamamadi, Acre and Amazonas, Brazil
Kaxinawá (Cashinahua, Huni Kuin), Peru and Acre, Brazil
Kulina (Culina), Peru
Kwaza (Coaiá, Koaiá), Rondônia, Brazil
Latundê, Rondônia, Brazil
Machinere, Peru
Mashco-Piro, Peru
Matís (Matis), Brazil
Matsés (Mayoruna, Maxuruna), Brazil, Peru
Parintintin (Kagwahiva’nga), Brazil
Shipibo, Loreto Region, Peru
Ticuna (Tucuna), Brazil, Colombia, Peru
Toromona, La Paz Department, Bolivia
Yanesha' (Amuesha), Cusco Region, Peru
Yawanawa (Jaminawá, Marinawá, Xixinawá), Acre, Brazil; Madre de Dios, Peru; and Bolivia
Yine (Contaquiro, Simiranch, Simirinche), Cuzco Region, Peru

Gran Chaco

 Abipón, Argentina, historic group
 Angaite (Angate), northwestern Paraguay
 Ayoreo (Morotoco, Moro, Zamuco), Bolivia and Paraguay
 Chamacoco (Zamuko), Paraguay
 Chané, Argentina and Bolivia
 Chiquitano (Chiquito, Tarapecosi), eastern Bolivia
 Chorote (Choroti), Iyojwa'ja Chorote, Manjuy), Argentina, Bolivia, and Paraguay
 Guana (Kaskihá), Paraguay
 Guaraní, Argentina, Bolivia, Brazil, and Paraguay
 Bolivian Guaraní
 Chiriguano, Bolivia
 Guarayo (East Bolivian Guarani)
 Chiripá (Tsiripá, Ava), Bolivia
 Pai Tavytera (Pai, Montese, Ava), Bolivia
 Tapieté (Guaraní Ñandéva, Yanaigua), eastern Bolivia
 Yuqui (Bia), Bolivia

 Guaycuru peoples, Argentina, Bolivia, Brazil, and Paraguay
 Mbayá (Caduveo), historic
 Kadiweu, Brazil
 Mocoví (Mocobí), Argentina
 Pilagá (Pilage Toba)
 Toba (Qom, Frentones), Argentina, Bolivia, and Paraguay
 Kaiwá, Argentina and Brazil
 Lengua people (Enxet), Paraguay
 North Lengua (Eenthlit, Enlhet, Maskoy), Paraguay
 South Lengua, Paraguay
 Lulé (Pelé, Tonocoté), Argentina
 Maká (Towolhi), Paraguay
 Nivaclé (Ashlushlay, Chulupí, Chulupe, Guentusé), Argentina and Paraguay
 Sanapaná (Quiativis), Paraguay
 Vilela, Argentina
 Wichí (Mataco), Argentina and Bolivia

Southern Cone

Aché, southeastern Paraguay
Chaná (extinct), Argentina and Uruguay
Chandule (Chandri)
Charrúa, southern Brazil and Uruguay
Comechingón (Henia-Camiare), Argentina
Haush (Manek'enk, Mánekenk, Aush), Tierra del Fuego
Het (Querandí) (extinct), formerly Argentinian Pampas
 Chechehet
 Didiuhet
 Taluhet
Huarpe (Warpes) (extinct), Strait of Magellan, Chile
 Allentiac (Alyentiyak)
 Millcayac (Milykayak)
 Oico
Mapuche (Araucanian), southwestern Argentina and Chile
 Mapuche-Huilliche (Hulliche), Chile
Cunco, western Zona Sur, Chile
Llanistas, plains of Osorno, Chile
Manzaneros, Neuquén Province, Argentina
Veliche, Chiloé Archipelago, Chile
Boroano, Chile and formerly in Argentina
Moluche, Araucanía, Chile
Lafquenche, Araucanía, Chile
 Pehuenche, south central Chile and Argentina
 Picunche, formerly Central Chile
 Promaucae, formerly Central Chile
Mbeguá (extinct), formerly Paraná River, Argentina
Minuane (extinct), formerly Uruguay
Poya (extinct), formerly Nahuel Huapi lake, Argentina
Puelche (Guenaken, Pampa) (extinct), Argentinian and Chilean Andes
Tehuelche, Patagonia
 Künün-a-Güna (Gennakenk, Gennaken)
 Küwach-a-Güna
 Mecharnúekenk
 Aónikenk (Zuidelijke Tehuelche)
Teushen (Tehues, extinct), Tierra del Fuego
Selk'nam (Ona), Tierra del Fuego
Yaro |Jaro)

Patagonian channels
Chono (Precolumbian culture), formerly archipelagoes of Chiloé, Guaitecas and Chonos, Guayaneco and Taitao Peninsula
Payos, formerly southeastern Chiloé Archipelago
Kawésqar (Alacaluf, Halakwulup), archipelagoes of Guayaneco, Campana, Queen Adelaide, Wellington Island, Strait of Magellan
Yahgan (Yamana), southern Tierra del Fuego

See also

Classification of indigenous peoples of the Americas
List of indigenous peoples of Brazil
Archaeology of the Americas
List of pre-Columbian cultures
Metallurgy in pre-Columbian America
Pre-Columbian South America
Pre-Inca cultures

Notes

External links

 
History of indigenous peoples of South America
South America